The 1988 European Cup final was a football match played between PSV Eindhoven of the Netherlands and Benfica of Portugal to decide the champion of the 1987–88 European Cup. PSV won 6–5 on penalties after a goalless draw after extra time. The match was played at Neckarstadion, Stuttgart, on 25 May 1988. According to PSV player Berry van Aerle, it was not a particularly good match, with both teams very cautious. However, it was exciting until the end and concluded in a tense penalty shoot-out.

For PSV, this win secured a treble of the Dutch Cup, the Dutch Championship and the European Cup. Five members of the PSV side were also part of the Netherlands team that went on to win UEFA Euro 1988 in West Germany that summer.

Road to the final

Match

Details

See also
1987–88 European Cup
PSV Eindhoven in European football
S.L. Benfica in international football

References

External links
1987-88 season at UEFA website
European Cup results at Rec.Sport.Soccer Statistics Foundation

1
European Cup Final 1988
European Cup Final 1988
European Cup Final 1988
1988
European Cup Final 1988
International club association football competitions hosted by Germany
1980s in Baden-Württemberg
Euro
Euro
May 1988 sports events in Europe
Football in Baden-Württemberg
20th century in Stuttgart